Gemmuloborsonia colorata is a species of sea snail, a marine gastropod mollusk in the family Turridae.

Description
The length of the shell attains 45.5 mm.

Distribution
This marine species occurs at depths between 490 m and 550 m off Vanuatu, New Caledonia, in the Coral Sea and French Polynesia. It has also been found in the Indian Ocean off Madagascar and Réunion.

References

 Sysoev A. & Bouchet P. (2001) New and uncommon turriform gastropods (Gastropoda: Conoidea) from the South-West Pacific. In: P. Bouchet & B.A. Marshall (eds), Tropical Deep-Sea Benthos, volume 22. Mémoires du Muséum National d'Histoire Naturelle 185: 271-320 page(s): 294

External links
 Puillandre, N., C. Cruaud, and Yu I. Kantor. "Cryptic species in Gemmuloborsonia (Gastropoda: Conoidea)." Journal of Molluscan Studies 76.1 (2010): 11-23
 Bouchet, Philippe, et al. "A quarter-century of deep-sea malacological exploration in the South and West Pacific: where do we stand? How far to go." Tropical deep-sea Benthos 25 (2008): 9-40
 Specimen of Gemmuloborsonia colorata at MNHN, Paris

colorata
Gastropods described in 2001